John Tavener (January 10, 1921 – September 19, 1993) was an American football player.  He was elected to the College Football Hall of Fame in 1990.

References

1921 births
1993 deaths
All-American college football players
Indiana Hoosiers football players
College Football Hall of Fame inductees
Sportspeople from Newark, Ohio